Mazhar Saleem Khan, born 11 September 1964 in Rawalpindi, Pakistan, is a Pakistani-born former cricketer who played for the Oman national cricket team. He is a right-handed batsman and right-arm off-spin bowler. He made several appearances for the Omani national team as a batsman in the 2005 ICC Trophy. He later coached Oman at the 2007 World Cricket League Division Two tournament.

References

1964 births
Living people
Omani cricketers
Pakistani cricket coaches
Cricketers from Rawalpindi
Pakistani emigrants to Oman
Pakistani expatriates in Oman
Coaches of the Oman national cricket team